The 1982 Indiana Hoosiers football team represented the Indiana Hoosiers in the 1982 Big Ten Conference football season. They participated as members of the Big Ten Conference. The Hoosiers played their home games at Memorial Stadium in Bloomington, Indiana. The team was coached by Lee Corso, in his 10th year as head coach of the Hoosiers, before being fired at the end of the season.

Schedule

Roster
WR Duane Gunn
QB Babe Laufenberg, Sr.

1983 NFL draftees

References

Indiana
Indiana Hoosiers football seasons
Indiana Hoosiers football